"Lord Somerset" may refer to:

Any of the Dukes of Somerset including the Earls of Somerset, notably:
 Edward Seymour, 1st Duke of Somerset (c. 1500–1552), Lord Protector
Viscount Somerset of the Irish peerage
Male members of the families of the Dukes of Beaufort and the Earls and Marquesses of Worcester, notably:
Field Marshal FitzRoy Somerset, 1st Baron Raglan (1788–1855), soldier
General Lord Charles Somerset (1767–1831), soldier, politician and colonial administrator
General Lord Edward Somerset (1776–1842), soldier
Rt Hon Lord Arthur Somerset (1780-1816), politician
Lord Henry Somerset (1849–1932), politician and composer
Lord Arthur Somerset (1851-1926), soldier, linked with scandal
Lord Edward Somerset (b. 1 May 1958), and Lord John (Johnson) Somerset (b. 5 Nov 1964), music producer, sons of David Somerset, 11th Duke of Beaufort
Reginald Birchall, who used the name "Lord Somerset" in Canada